Marisa Lee Pedulla (born April 25, 1969) is an American former Olympic judoka. She was born in Bellefonte, Pennsylvania. Pedulla was member of the US Team at the 1996 Summer Olympics in the 52kg under division. She would later serve as a Coach at the US Olympic Judo team at Athens. She is a Professor of Biology at Montana Tech of the University of Montana. At Montana Tech, she authored "Phagedigging" - Introducing Students to Biological Research.

Also, she is an American Gladiator champion.

References

1969 births
Living people
American female judoka
Olympic judoka of the United States
Judoka at the 1996 Summer Olympics
Judoka trainers
21st-century American women